Zizaniopsis is a genus of plants in the grass family, Poaceae, native to North and South America.

 Species
 Zizaniopsis bonariensis (Balansa & Poitr.) Speg. - Uruguay, Brazil (Rio Grande do Sul), Argentina (Buenos Aires, Entre Ríos, Corrientes)
 Zizaniopsis killipii Swallen - Colombia (Chocó)
 Zizaniopsis microstachya (Nees) Döll & Asch. - Uruguay, Brazil, Argentina 
 Zizaniopsis miliacea (Michx.) Döll & Asch. - southeastern + south-central United States (TX to IL + MD), Mexico (Jalisco, Veracruz, Michoacán)
 Zizaniopsis villanensis Quarín - Argentina

References

External links

 Grassbase - The World Online Grass Flora

Oryzoideae
Grasses of North America
Grasses of South America
Poaceae genera
Taxa named by Paul Friedrich August Ascherson